Scalzone is an Italian surname. Notable people with the surname include:

Alfonso Scalzone (born 1996), Italian rower
Angelo Scalzone (1931–1987), Italian sports shooter 
Roberto Scalzone (1962–2019), Italian sports shooter 
Oreste Scalzone (born 1947), Italian Marxist intellectual

Italian-language surnames